The Cinque Gallery was an artist run space in New York that displayed and supported the work of African American artists. It was founded in 1969 by artists Romare Bearden, Ernest Crichlow, and Norman Lewis. It closed in 2004. The gallery was known for nurturing a mutually supportive community of artists. It was named after Sengbe Pieh, also known as Joseph Cinqué, who led a rebellion in 1839 aboard La Amistad, a Spanish ship that transported enslaved people.

The gallery presented the work of around 450 artists over the course of its history.

References 

Artist-run centres
Art galleries established in 1969
Art galleries disestablished in 2004
Art museums and galleries in New York City